The 378th Troop Carrier Squadron is an inactive United States Air Force unit. It was last assigned to the 60th Troop Carrier Wing. It was inactivated at Dreux-Louvilliers Air Base, France on 25 September 1958.

History
Established as a B-25 Mitchell medium bombardment squadron in early 1942; trained under Third Air Force. Assigned to Columbia Army Air Base, South Carolina as first an Operational Training Unit (OTU) for newly formed squadrons, then in 1943 becoming a Replacement Training Unit (RTU) for pilots and aircrew on the B-25 prior to the personnel being assigned overseas to combat units. Inactivated on 1 May 1944 with the phaseout of B-25 training.

Reactivated in 1949 in the Air Force Reserve as a Troop Carrier Squadron Programmed for C-46 Commandoes, never manned or equipped. Inactivated in 1951.

Reactivated in 1955 as a Tactical Air Command C-123 Provider Troop Carrier Squadron, being one of the first squadrons being equipped with the aircraft. Deployed to France in 1956 to reinforce NATO and the United States Air Forces in Europe. Flew transport and special air missions (SAM) throughout France, West Germany, Italy, Spain and England. Flew several Dispersed Operating Base supply missions and reduced the need for road convoys. However cost of operations were high and USAFE decided that the C-123s were worth the expense. Aircraft, equipment and personnel returned to Ardmore AFB during July and August 1958 where aircraft and personnel reassigned to squadrons of the 463d Troop Carrier Wing at Sewart AFB, Tennessee. Squadron inactivated as a paper unit in September 1958.

Lineage

 Constituted 378th Bombardment Squadron (Medium) on 28 January 1942
 Activated on 15 March 1942
 Disbanded on 1 May 1944
 Reconstituted, and redesignated 378th Troop Carrier Squadron (Medium), on 16 May 1949
 Activated in the reserve on 26 June 1949
 Inactivated on 28 January 1950
 Redesignated 378th Troop Carrier Squadron (Assault, Fixed Wing) on 14 April 1955
 Activated on 8 July 1955
 Redesignated 378th Troop Carrier Squadron (Assault) on 15 July 1958
 Inactivated on 25 September 1958

Assignments
 309th Bombardment Group, 15 March 1942 – 1 May 1944
 309th Troop Carrier Group, 26 June 1949 – 28 January 1950; 8 July 1955
 Attached to 60th Troop Carrier Wing, 15 November 1956 – 11 March 1957
 60th Troop Carrier Wing, 12 March 1957 – 25 September 1958

Stations
 Davis–Monthan Field, Arizona, 15 March 1942
 Jackson Army Air Base, Mississippi, 15 March 1942
 Key Field, Mississippi, 29 April 1942;
 Columbia Army Air Base, South Carolina, 15 May 1942 – 1 May 1944
 Smyrna AFB, Tennessee, 26 June 1949 – 28 January 1950
 Ardmore AFB, Oklahoma, 8 July 1955 – 21 May 1956
 Dreux-Louvilliers Air Base, France, 2 June 1956 – 25 September 1958

Aircraft
 B-25 Mitchell, 1942–1944
 C-123 Provider, 1955–1958

References

 
 
 772d Expeditionary Airlift Squadron (ACC) Factsheet

Troop carrier squadrons of the United States Air Force
Military units and formations established in 1949